Motjeka Madisha (12 January 1995 – 12 December 2020) was a South African professional soccer player who played for Mamelodi Sundowns, as a defender.

Club career
Madisha played club football for M Tigers, Highlands Park and Sundowns.

International career
He earned 13 caps for the South Africa national team between 2015 and 2020, scoring once.

International goals
Scores and results list South Africa's goal tally first.

Death
He died in a car crash on 12 December 2020, on a road east of Johannesburg.

References

1995 births
2020 deaths
South African soccer players
M Tigers F.C. players
Highlands Park F.C. players
Mamelodi Sundowns F.C. players
South African Premier Division players
Association football defenders
South Africa international soccer players
Road incident deaths in South Africa
Soccer players from Gauteng